An ammunition box or cartridge box is a container designed for safe transport and storage of ammunition. It is typically made of metal and labelled with caliber, quantity, and manufacturing date or lot number.  A rubber gasket is commonly found in the hinged lid to protect the ammunition from moisture damage.

The resealing ammunition box is largely a NATO tradition. Warsaw Pact nations typically stored and transported ammunition in single-use "spam cans". They had crates that had a sealed zinc lining on the inside.

Commercial ammunition boxes
Not all ammunition boxes are metal. Wood and corrugated  fiberboard have also historically been used as a method of packaging and storing ammunition. Some enthusiasts and investors collect historical ammunition boxes.

Storage
Due to their durable construction, used metal ammunition boxes are popularly re-used for general storage and other purposes. They are a popular choice for geocaching containers.  Used ammunition boxes have lead and propellant residue inside, so they should not be used to store food or drink. Commercially-made new or fully reconditioned used boxes do not have this problem. Used boxes are often sold at military surplus stores.

References

External links
European Ammo Box Translations

Ammunition
Containers